In geometry, the great 120-cell or great polydodecahedron is a regular star 4-polytope with Schläfli symbol {5,5/2,5}. It is one of 10 regular Schläfli-Hess polytopes. It is one of the two such polytopes that is self-dual.

Related polytopes 

It has the same edge arrangement as the 600-cell, icosahedral 120-cell as well as the same face arrangement as the grand 120-cell.

Due to its self-duality, it does not have a good three-dimensional analogue, but (like all other star polyhedra and polychora) is analogous to the two-dimensional pentagram.

See also 
 List of regular polytopes
 Convex regular 4-polytope
 Kepler-Poinsot solids regular star polyhedron
 Star polygon regular star polygons

References 
 Edmund Hess, (1883) Einleitung in die Lehre von der Kugelteilung mit besonderer Berücksichtigung ihrer Anwendung auf die Theorie der Gleichflächigen und der gleicheckigen Polyeder .
H. S. M. Coxeter, Regular Polytopes, 3rd. ed., Dover Publications, 1973. .
 John H. Conway, Heidi Burgiel, Chaim Goodman-Strass, The Symmetries of Things 2008,  (Chapter 26, Regular Star-polytopes, pp. 404–408)

External links 
 Regular polychora 
 Discussion on names
 Reguläre Polytope
 The Regular Star Polychora

4-polytopes